Richard Andrew Beaumont (5 April 1961 – 26 April 2022) was a British actor, known for playing the role of Tiny Tim in the 1970 film Scrooge, a musical version of A Christmas Carol by Charles Dickens, starring Albert Finney.

Beaumont died after a short illness on 26 April 2022, at the age of 60, eleven days after his son Bobby had died at the age of 36.

Selected filmography
 Strange Report (1969)
 The Wednesday Play (1970)
 Scrooge (1970)
 Mr. Tumbleweed (1971)
 Whoever Slew Auntie Roo? (1972)
 Demons of the Mind (1972)
 Zinotchka (1972)
 Digby, the Biggest Dog in the World (1973)
 Great Expectations (1974)
 Churchill's People (1974-75)
 Leap in the Dark (1980)

References

External links

1961 births
2022 deaths
British male film actors
Male actors from Hertfordshire
Actors from St Albans
20th-century British male actors
21st-century British male actors
British child actors
English male child actors